{{Speciesbox
|image=
|image_caption=
|status=DD
|status_system=IUCN3.1
|status_ref=<ref name=iucn>{{cite iucn |author1=G. Lyons |author2=L. Allcock |title='Opisthoteuthis philipii |volume=2014 |page=e.T163221A985854 |doi=10.2305/IUCN.UK.2014-3.RLTS.T163221A985854.en}}</ref>
|genus=Opisthoteuthis
|species=philipii
|authority=Oommmen, 1976
}}Opisthoteuthis philipii''' is an octopus of the Indian Ocean. It lives off the coast of Kerala, India.

Description
Oommen described the species based on three animals. Not much is known about the species beyond these specimens. Oommen found that the arms were different lengths, and that his specimens, like many other cirrate ("Dumbo") octopuses, had thick webs connecting their arms. The cirri are retractable. Cirri are the small, thread-like structures that give cirrate octopuses their name. They line the octopuses' arms. Opisthoteuthis philipii is distinguishable from other Opisthoteuthis'' species by its uniquely shaped beak.

References

Further reading

Octopuses
Molluscs described in 1976
Molluscs of the Indian Ocean
Cephalopods of Asia